Grey County is a county in Ontario, Canada.

Grey County may also refer to:

 Grey County, New Zealand
 Grey County, Western Australia

See also
 County of Grey, South Australia
 Gray County (disambiguation)